Hanadi Zakaria al-Hindi is the first Saudi woman to become a pilot. She was born in Mecca in September 1978. She passed her final exams at the Middle East Academy for Commercial Aviation in Amman, Jordan on 15 June 2005. She has a ten-year contract with Prince Al-Waleed bin Talal’s Kingdom Holding Company as a pilot of his private jet, the Kingdom. Al-Waleed is considered a proponent for female emancipation in the Saudi world, financed her training and stated on her graduation that he is "in full support of Saudi ladies working in all fields".  Al-Hindi became certified to fly within Saudi Arabia in 2014.

Reports highlighted the irony that a Saudi woman is allowed to pilot an aeroplane but may not drive a car (although this has changed in 2017). Al-Hindi, however, does not see this as a contradiction.

References

1978 births
Living people
People from Mecca
Women aviators
Saudi Arabian aviators
Saudi Arabian women
Women commercial aviators